Allcock is a surname. Notable people with the surname include:

Amy Allcock (born 1993), British sprinter
Annette Allcock (born 1923), English artist
Bill Allcock (1907–1971), English footballer
Charles Allcock (1855–1947), English cricketer
Daniel Allcock, American mathematician, professor of mathematics at the University of Texas at Austin
Frank Allcock (1925–2005), English footballer
Harry R. Allcock (born 1932), American academic chemist
Henry Allcock (1759–1808), English judge
Ken Allcock (1921–1996), English footballer
Louise Allcock, British marine biologist
Maartin Allcock (1957–2018), English musician
Terry Allcock (born 1935), English footballer
Thomas Allcock (1815–1891), American inventor and businessman
Tony Allcock (born 1955), English bowls player

English-language surnames